Cliff Letcher (9 February 1952 – 31 December 2004) was a professional tennis player from Australia. He played Davis Cup for Austria. 

Letcher enjoyed most of his tennis success while playing doubles. During his career, he won two doubles titles and finished runner-up in doubles at three Grand Slam events.

Letcher died on 31 December 2004.  

His children Clint, Chris and Sophie Letcher were also professional tennis players.

Career finals

Doubles (2 wins, 9 losses)

References

External links
 
 
 

Australian male tennis players
Australian Open (tennis) junior champions
Tennis people from Victoria (Australia)
1952 births
2004 deaths
Grand Slam (tennis) champions in boys' singles
Austrian male tennis players
20th-century Australian people